The 2007 2. divisjon was the third highest football league for men in Norway.

26 games were played in 4 groups, with 3 points given for wins and 1 for draws. Nybergsund, Hødd, Sandnes Ulf and Alta were promoted to the First Division. Number twelve, thirteen and fourteen were relegated to the 3. divisjon. The winning teams from each of the 24 groups in the 3. divisjon each faced a winning team from another group in a playoff match, resulting in 12 playoff winners which were promoted to the 2. divisjon.

League tables

Group 1

Group 2

Group 3

Group 4

Top goalscorers
 26 goals:
  Stian Nikodemussen, Tønsberg
  Christian Torbjørnsen, Groruddalen
  Jan Tømmernes, Asker
 24 goals:
  Eirik Markegård, Stabæk 2
 22 goals:
  Martin Hansen, Skeid
  Sigmund Grøterud, Åmot
 20 goals:
  Knut Hovel Heiaas, Drøbak/Frogn
  Geir Holthe, Ranheim
 18 goals:
  Sezan Ismailovski, Groruddalen
 17 goals:
  Bjørn Inge Rødfoss, Eidsvold Turn
  Kjetil Bøe, Flekkerøy
  Jarle Wee, Vard
 16 goals:
  Jo Sondre Aas, Rosenborg 2

Promotion playoff

References
Tables: 1, 2, 3, 4
Goalscorers

Norwegian Second Division seasons
3
Norway
Norway